San Juan de Letrán is a metro station along Line 8 of the Mexico City Metro. It is located in Mexico City's  Cuauhtémoc borough in the city centre, or Centro.

The station logo depicts the silhouette of the nearby Torre Latinoamericana, and the name San Juan de Letrán is the name of a church in Rome, Italy.  San Juan de Letrán was the former name of Mexico City's central avenue, on which the station stands. Another stretch further south was named Avenida Niño Perdido ("Lost Child"). Today its name is Eje Central Lázaro Cárdenas.  The station was opened, along with all the others on Line 8, on 20 July 1994.

Ridership

References

External links 
 

Mexico City Metro Line 8 stations
Railway stations opened in 1994
1994 establishments in Mexico
Mexico City Metro stations in Cuauhtémoc, Mexico City